Clarinbridge GAA is a Gaelic Athletic Association club located in the village of Clarinbridge in County Galway, Ireland.  The club is almost exclusively concerned with the game of hurling. In March 2011, they won their first All-Ireland Senior Club Hurling Championship, defeating O'Loughlin Gaels by 2-18 to 0-12 at Croke Park. Micheál Donoghue was manager of that team.

Honours

Hurling
All-Ireland Senior Club Hurling Championships:
 2011
Connacht Senior Club Hurling Championships:
 2001, 2010
Galway Senior Club Hurling Championships:
 2001, 2010
Galway Minor "A" Hurling Championships: 
 1992, 1998, 2015, 2016, 2018

References

External links
Clarinbridge GAA site

Gaelic games clubs in County Galway
Hurling clubs in County Galway